The Welsh Hawking Centre and Children's Animal Park is a hawking centre on Weycock Road (A4226 road) on the northwestern outskirts of Barry, Vale of Glamorgan, in southern Wales. It contains the largest collection of birds of prey in Wales, with over 200 birds on site including eagles, owls, hawks, falcons and buzzards.

In 2007 seven falcon chicks were stolen from the centre.

References

External links
 Official site

Buildings and structures in Barry, Vale of Glamorgan
Falconry
Tourist attractions in the Vale of Glamorgan